The Last In Line is the second studio album by American heavy metal band Dio, released on July 2, 1984. It is the first Dio album to feature former Rough Cutt keyboardist Claude Schnell. It became the band's highest-charting album in both the UK and the U.S., reaching number 4 and number 23, respectively (Sacred Heart would later reach number 4 in the UK as well).

It was certified gold (500,000 units sold) by the RIAA on September 12, 1984, and was the first Dio album to be certified platinum, achieving the feat on February 3, 1987. In the UK, it attained Silver certification (60,000 units sold) by the British Phonographic Industry, achieving this in January 1986, at the same time as Holy Diver.  To date, these are the only two Dio albums to be certified at least platinum.

Reissues 
The album, along with Holy Diver and Sacred Heart, was released in a new two-CD deluxe edition on March 19, 2012 through Universal for worldwide distribution outside the U.S.

Critical reception

In 2005, The Last In Line was ranked number 372 in Rock Hard magazine's book of The 500 Greatest Rock & Metal Albums of All Time.

Track listing

Personnel
Dio
 Ronnie James Dio – vocals, keyboards
 Vinny Appice – drums
 Jimmy Bain – bass
 Vivian Campbell – guitar
 Claude Schnell – keyboards

Production
 Recorded at Caribou Ranch, Colorado
 Produced by Ronnie James Dio
 Engineered by Angelo Arcuri
 Assistant engineering by Rich Markowitz
 Mixed on Westlake Audio BBSM6 monitors
 Originally mastered by George Marino at Sterling Sound, New York
 Remastered by Andy Pearce (2012 Universal Deluxe Edition)
 Remastered by Steve Hoffman (2012 Audio Fidelity 24K edition)
 Illustration by Barry Jackson

Charts

Album

Singles

Mystery

We Rock

The Last in Line

Certifications

References

External links 
 The Last in Line song lyrics

1984 albums
Dio (band) albums
Vertigo Records albums
Warner Records albums